Buck Creek is a  tributary of the Grand River in Kent and Allegan counties in the U.S. state of Michigan. It rises in northern Allegan County in Byron and Gaines townships, and flows through the cities of Kentwood and Wyoming as an urban stream to enter the Grand River in Grandville. The Grand River is a tributary of Lake Michigan.

Hydrology
The creek drains portions of Byron Township, Gaines Township, the City of Kentwood, the City of Wyoming, the City of Grandville, and Grand Rapids. Pine Hill Creek and Sharps Creek enter Buck Creek in the city of Wyoming. Other tributaries have been incorporated into the Kent County drain system.

Ecology 
The Michigan Department of Natural Resources engages in fish stocking the creek with brown trout in certain locations on an annual basis.

Parks

Buck Creek Trail 
The City of Grandville and the City of Wyoming teamed up to build a trail system that follows Buck Creek. The project started 30 years ago and has developed into a system of beautiful trails along the creek. The trail is currently in three segments. One from the Baldwin Street Trailhead in Jenison, Michigan to Broadway St. in Grandville. This is the newest segment. The next is down Canal St. to the Grandville segment which goes through Wedgewood Park. The third piece is the Wyoming segment which starts at Lemery Park, goes through the Buck Creek Nature preserve and finishes out at Palmer Park. Westmichigantrails.com says it takes some navigational skills to complete but is well worth the effort in the end.

Wedgwood Park 
Wedgwood Park located on Wilson Ave in Grandville, Michigan right next to the Grandville Middle school. The park features a football field with new goalposts put in spring of 2012 and has small sets of bleachers on either side. The football field is used by Grandville Rocket Football and the home for the Grandville Girls Rugby Club. The park has bathrooms, a nice playground with much room for children to run around and play a large pavilion with picnic tables, stand up charcoal grills, benches, and a beautiful bridge that connects to the Grandville Middle School. Part of Buck Creek Trail goes through the park and has many different places with benches to view the Buck Creek.

Lemery Park 
Lemery Park is located just off of Byron Center about a half mile north of 44th street (4050 Byron Center Ave. SW) The park is about 87 acres with Buck Creek and the Buck Creek Trail both running through it. The park has tennis courts, basketball courts, little league and softball fields, restrooms, picnic area, a concession stand and a walking trail. The park also has great playground equipment and space to run around. Since Buck Creek runs through it there are many great opportunities for fishing. It is a beautiful park great for activities, picnics, exercise, and just enjoy nature.

Palmer Park 
Palmer Park is located at 1275 52nd Street SW Wyoming, MI 49509. It is partially surrounded by Kaufman Golf Course (4807 Clyde Park).  The park has baseball diamonds, biking, cross country skiing, fishing, an 18-hole golf course, picnicking, hiking/walking, a playground, an open shelterhouse, and restrooms.

Kelloggsville Park 
5100 Haughey SW Kellogsville Park is about 8.5 acres. Kent County Bike Trail runs through the park. The park has Softball fields, a great playground, tennis courts, basketball courts, restrooms, picnic area, a shelter, and charcoal grills.

Veteran's Park 
Located on 48th street between Eastern and Division.
The park was built and run by the City of Kentwood. The park covers 15 acres. The park has a splash pad, restrooms, three sided picnic shelters, a large charcoal grill, soccer fields, tennis courts, basketball courts, and a sand volleyball court. The park has a few different playgrounds, a climbing wall, swings, baby swings, play structures, and climbers.

Kelloggs Woods Park 
199 Kellogg Woods Park Dr SE, Kentwood
The park has a baseball diamond, two softball fields, a soccer field, a skate park, a small climbing structure, a playground, and plenty of room to run around.

Buck Creek Nature Preserve 
Buck Creek Nature preserve covers 37.5 acres in Wyoming, Michigan. The park contains many trails and boardwalks, public restrooms, picnic areas and much access to Buck Creek itself, presenting many fishing opportunities. 
The park is located at 4269 Burlingame Avenue, Wyoming, Michigan 49519.

References

 
 

Rivers of Kent County, Michigan
Rivers of Allegan County, Michigan
Rivers of Michigan
Tributaries of Lake Michigan